Crummell is a surname. Notable people with the surname include:

Alexander Crummell (1819–1898), African-American minister, academic and African nationalist
Dan Crummell, Canadian politician